Starve for the Devil is the fourth studio album by the melodic death metal band Arsis. It was released on February 9, 2010, by Nuclear Blast Records.

History
Recording started in September 2009 at Planet Z Studios. Production was handled by Chris "Zeuss" Harris, who is best known for his work with Rob Zombie, Queensryche, Hatebreed, Overkill, and many others. The album artwork was handled by Mark Riddick, who worked with Arsis on all of their earlier releases. Starve for the Devil debuted at No. 13 on the Billboard Top New Artist Albums (Heatseekers) chart, making it the highest charting Arsis album.

Although Starve for the Devil was originally scheduled for a January 15 release date, it was pushed back into February with an announcement that a bonus track would be included on the European and Asian releases, and that two bonus tracks would be included on the limited Nuclear Blast mail order and vinyl editions. However, the second bonus track, a cover version of King Diamond's "The Lake",  was pulled and only made available on the EMI compilation March is Metal Month 2010.

In January, 2010, Arsis released a music video for "Forced to Rock", the first track on Starve for the Devil.

Reception
Starve for the Devil received positive reviews from numerous publications, including Metal Assault, Blistering, The Metal Files, Metal Injection, Pop Matters, and About.com.

Track listing
All songs written by James Malone, except where noted.
 "Forced to Rock" - 2:56
 "A March for the Sick" - 4:23
 "From Soulless to Shattered (Art in Dying)" (Cordle) - 4:27
 "Beyond Forlorn" - 4:01
 "The Ten of Swords" - 3:44
 "Closer to Cold" (Cordle) - 5:08 
 "Sick Perfection" (Malone/Cordle) - 3:55 
 "Half Past Corpse O'Clock" - 4:12
 "Escape Artist" (Cordle) - 4:22 
 "Sable Rising" - 3:36

Limited edition bonus track
 "A Pound of Flesh (For the Hell of It)" - 3:27

Credits

Personnel
 James Malone - vocals, lead and rhythm guitar
 Mike Van Dyne - drums
 Nick Cordle - lead and rhythm guitar
 Nathaniel Carter - bass guitar

Production
Chris "Zeuss" Harris - engineering, mixing, mastering
Mark Riddick - artwork, layout
Tonya Rose - design

References

Arsis albums
2010 albums
Nuclear Blast albums
Albums produced by Chris "Zeuss" Harris